The Trans-Labrador Highway (TLH) is the primary public road in Labrador, the mainland portion of the province of Newfoundland and Labrador, Canada. The paving of the entire highway was completed in July 2022.

The original western/central portion of the TLH is designated as Route 500 and measures  divided as follows:
 Quebec - Labrador boundary to Labrador City/Wabush (asphalt surface)
 Labrador City/Wabush to Churchill Falls (asphalt surface)
 Churchill Falls to Happy Valley-Goose Bay (asphalt surface)

Heading southeast is Route 510, the north portion of the TLH that has been designated Labrador Coastal Drive and measures  divided as follows:

 Happy Valley-Goose Bay to Cartwright Junction ( asphalt,  gravel, the remainder was paved in 2022
 Cartwright Junction to Port Hope Simpson (asphalt surface)
 Port Hope Simpson to Mary's Harbour (asphalt surface)
 Mary's Harbour to Lodge Bay (asphalt surface)
 Lodge Bay to Red Bay (asphalt surface)
 Red Bay to Quebec - Labrador boundary via Blanc-Sablon (asphalt surface)

The TLH runs through dense wilderness for most of its length with no roadside services between communities. 
Route 500 connects with Quebec Route 389, which runs  through wilderness north from Baie-Comeau to the Quebec - Labrador boundary. Cell phone reception along the Trans-Labrador Highway is limited.

In the 2020 budget, the provincial government allocated $200,000 for a pre-feasibility study for a road to connect the north coast of Labrador to the Trans-Labrador Highway.

Construction and development

Phase I, upgrading Labrador West to Happy Valley-Goose Bay

The original TLH from Labrador West (Labrador City/Wabush) to Happy Valley-Goose Bay was completed in 1992. Some sections were poorly built or in need of upgrades due to increased traffic use, particularly the section between Churchill Falls and Happy Valley-Goose Bay. In the  summer of 1999, $60 million was allocated to upgrade the highway as part of the "Labrador Transportation Initiative".

The Phase I section of the TLH began undergoing paving operations in 2009; by October 2011, a stretch of approximately  leading east from Labrador West had been paved, as well approximately  heading west from Goose Bay towards Churchill Falls. The entire Phase I section of the TLH was completed in 2015.

Route 510

In 1997 the Government of Newfoundland and Labrador committed to building an extension of the TLH, connecting Happy Valley-Goose Bay with an existing isolated road network serving coastal communities on the Strait of Belle Isle. The impetus for this project was the federal government's desire to cut costs and remove itself from subsidizing coastal ferry service to Labrador outports which was being provided by the federal Crown corporation Marine Atlantic.

These federal cuts were completed in 1997, under the moniker Labrador Transportation Initiative, when an agreement was signed which saw the federal government transfer ownership and operation of two ferry vessels, along with C$340 million for extending Labrador's road network. A key component to this plan was $150 million to upgrade coastal Labrador marine services, including a newer high-capacity ferry for the St. Barbe-Blanc Sablon service across the Strait of Belle Isle.

Phase II, Red Bay to Cartwright Junction

Phase II of new construction, costing $130 million, began in 1999 and saw Route 510 extended  over four years from its terminus in Red Bay northeast to the port of Cartwright. This section was paved as far as Cartwright Junction, the unpaved remainder (to Cartwright) being designated Highway 516.

Phase III, Cartwright Junction to Happy Valley-Goose Bay

Phase III is a  section of Route 510 built for $130 million south of Lake Melville/Hamilton Inlet to connect Cartwright Junction ( south west of Cartwright) with Happy Valley-Goose Bay, completed sufficiently to open to traffic as a gravel road on 16 December 2009. During 2010, two permanent bridges, road surface work, signage, and guardrails were completed at a cost of $15 million. The remainder was completed in July 2022.

Route 516 and supplementary routes

Phase II involved completion of highway north to Cartwright from Red Bay, and was opened in 2002. Although the entire route was initially designated as Route 510, upon completion of Phase III, the northern  from Cartwright Junction (to Cartwright) was designated as Route 516.

Phase II also included other branch routes:

 Route 513 to St. Lewis
 Route 514 to Charlottetown and Pinsent Arm

A segment of Quebec Route 138 extends from Old Fort, Quebec to the Newfoundland and Labrador border connecting with Route 510 near Blanc-Sablon on the eastern end of the Côte-Nord. A gap remains between Kegashka and Old Fort, through isolated communities accessible only by coastal ferry. On August 25, 2006, the Quebec government announced a 10-year project to connect the two segments by building 425 km of highway along the Lower North Shore. As of 2022, the highway has not been completed.

Kilometre markers

Route 500

Route 510

State of the road
Route 500

Route 510

Footnotes

See also

Churchill River (Atlantic)
Division No. 10, Newfoundland and Labrador
List of Newfoundland and Labrador highways
Newfoundland-Labrador fixed link
Newfoundland and Labrador Route 516
Quebec Route 138

References

External links

Map of the southern TLH
Community portraits along the southern TLH
Photos of snow pictures in southeastern Labrador

Newfoundland and Labrador provincial highways
Labrador